Irvin Branch is a  long 1st order tributary to Anderson Creek in Clearfield County, Pennsylvania.  Irvin Branch is classified as a coldwater fishery (CWF) and contains a population of Brook Trout.  Some mining has occurred in the headwaters of the stream, but it is not considered impaired by it.

Course 
Irvin Branch rises about 5 miles north of Greenville, Pennsylvania, and then flows southeast to join Anderson Creek about 0.5 miles northeast of Greenville.

Watershed 
Irvin Branch drains  of area, receives about 45.1 in/year of precipitation, has a wetness index of 377.55, and is about 97% forested.

See also 
 List of Pennsylvania Rivers

References

Watershed Maps 

Rivers of Pennsylvania
Rivers of Clearfield County, Pennsylvania